Ban Dong Bang station is a railway station located in Dong Bang Subdistrict, Prachantakham District, Prachinburi Province.

References 

Railway stations in Thailand
Prachinburi province